Sharon Jepkirui Bushenei (born 7 June 1988) is a Kenyan footballer who plays as a forward. She has been a member of the Kenya women's national team.

International career
Bushenei capped for Kenya at senior level during the 2014 African Women's Championship qualification.

See also
List of Kenya women's international footballers

References

1988 births
Living people
Kenyan women's footballers
Women's association football forwards
Kenya women's international footballers